The Minnesota Valley Wetland Management District is a fourteen-county district located in east central Minnesota, United States. It includes portions of the Minnesota, Cannon, and Mississippi River watersheds. The United States Fish and Wildlife Service works to protect the area's natural landscape through private lands habitat restorations, acquisition of waterfowl production areas (WPAs), and management of FmHA conservation easements.

References
District website

National Wildlife Refuges in Minnesota
Minnesota River
Mississippi National River and Recreation Area